Lucian Cary "Skippy" Whitaker (August 29, 1930 – August 1990) was an American basketball player.  He won an NCAA championship at the University of Kentucky in 1951 and played briefly in the National Basketball Association (NBA).

Whitaker, a 6'1 guard, played collegiately at Kentucky for Adolph Rupp.  As a junior, he was a member of the Wildcats' 1951 national championship team.

He was drafted by the Indianapolis Olympians in the 1952 NBA draft.  However, his only NBA action came playing three games for the Boston Celtics during the 1954–55 NBA season.  Whitaker scored 2 points in his 15 total minutes in the NBA.

References

1930 births
1990 deaths
Basketball players from Florida
Boston Celtics players
Guards (basketball)
Indianapolis Olympians draft picks
Kentucky Wildcats men's basketball players
Sportspeople from Sarasota, Florida
Sarasota High School alumni
American men's basketball players